Desjardins was a regional county municipality in the Chaudière-Appalaches region of Quebec, Canada. It and Les Chutes-de-la-Chaudière Regional County Municipality were formed from the division of Lévis County in the 1980s. Desjardins ceased to exist when most of it, along with most of Les Chutes-de-la-Chaudière RCM, amalgamated into the expanded city of Lévis on January 1, 2002.

Subdivisions
Desjardins RCM consisted of:
 Lévis (in its pre-amalgamation borders)
 Pintendre
 Saint-Henri
 Saint-Joseph-de-Lévy

Dissolution
When Desjardins RCM was dissolved, nearly all of its components amalgamated into the newly expanded Lévis:

 Lévis, Pintendre, Saint-Joseph-de-Lévy amalgamated into the newly expanded Lévis and comprised the Desjardins borough of that city.
 Saint-Henri remained independent and joined Bellechasse Regional County Municipality.

See also
 Municipal history of Quebec
Desjardins (disambiguation)

External links

References

Former regional county municipalities in Quebec
Lévis, Quebec
Populated places disestablished in 2002
2002 disestablishments in Quebec